Tanbi Wetland Complex is a wetland reserve in the Gambia outside of Banjul which was established in 2001.

Location
The wilderness site of the Tanbi Wetland Complex, in Gambia, is on the southern channel at the mouth of the River Gambia. It encompasses a total area of about 6,000 hectares, of which mangroves make up 4,800 hectares, located to the west and south west of Banjul. The northernmost portion of the complex skirts the Kankujeri Road of Banjul and includes Cape Creek. It encompasses the western shores of St. Mary Island and extends to the south east towards Lamin and Mandinari Village. It was declared a Ramsar convention protected site in February 2007.

Flora and habitat
Eighty per cent of the Tanbi Wetland Complex is composed of mangrove forest which are made up of several species of mangroves which includes Avicennia africana, Conocarpus erectus, Laguncularia racemosa, Annona glabra and the Rhizophora spp with the occasional Baobab or Borassius aethiopicus standing on the drier ground. The vegetation gradually changes to the west and south into bare flats, salt marsh and dry woodland, with agricultural land encroaching around the fringes of the complex.  There is a lattice work of tidal creeks, known to locals as bolongs, as well as tidal lagoons and estuarial saline mudflats.  The complex has a role in retaining incoming water and rainfall, stabilizing the shoreline, the retention of sediments and nutrients and also controlling their erosion, ground water replenishment and flood control, so Tanbi Wetlands acts as a hydrological buffer zone for the Banjul region.

Fauna
The complex is home to some troops of small monkeys, including troops of the Western red colobus while other interesting mammals recorded include the West African manatee, marsh mongoose and the Cape clawless otter. There are West African crocodiles as well as various snakes and lizards. Over 360 species of bird have been recorded in the complex including such interesting or charismatic species as Pel’s fishing owl, brown-necked parrot, blue-bellied roller and pygmy sunbird; while in the northern winter Palearctic migrants such as osprey, black-tailed godwit and Caspian tern are found.  Climate change and global warming pose a particular threat to wildlife in the wetlands as sea levels rise. It is an important breeding area for the shrimp Farfantepenaeus notialis.

Human activities
The main human activities in and around the complex are shrimp fishing, market gardening and the cultivation of rice. During the dry season, a small number of women from the Jola forage for, roast and sell oysters which they harvest from the mangroves, the oysters are cooked with firewood collected at the same time.

Climate change

In 2022, the IPCC Sixth Assessment Report included Tanbi Wetland Complex in the list of African natural heritage sites which would be threatened by flooding and coastal erosion by the end of the century, but only if climate change followed RCP 8.5, which is the scenario of high and continually increasing greenhouse gas emissions associated with the warming of over 4°C., and is no longer considered very likely. The other, more plausible scenarios result in lower warming levels and consequently lower sea level rise: yet, sea levels would continue to increase for about 10,000 years under all of them. Even if the warming is limited to 1.5°C, global sea level rise is still expected to exceed  after 2000 years (and higher warming levels will see larger increases by then), consequently exceeding 2100 levels of sea level rise under RCP 8.5 (~ with a range of ) well before the year 4000.

References

National parks of the Gambia
Protected areas established in 2001
Ramsar sites in the Gambia